Didar Sydykbek  (born 6 February 1993) is a Kazakh footballer who plays as a midfielder for Astana-64 in the Kazakhstan First Division. Didar also played in Kazakhstan Premier League and for the Kazakhstan U21 and U19 national teams.

Career
At the age of 16 Didar was in Kazakhstan Premier League side Kyzylzhar's squad in 2009. At the age of 18 he became a main squad player for Astana-64 in Kazakhstan First Division where he scored 13 goals in 53 games during 2 seasons. Following this, being recognized as one of the best young players in the division, Didar was loaned to the Kazakhstan Premier League sides Aktobe and Ordabasy where he made his debut in the top division of Kazakh football at the age of 20. After the 2014 season he went on trial with Polish Wisła Kraków.

Career statistics

External links

Living people
1993 births
Kazakhstani footballers
Kazakhstan Premier League players
FC Aktobe players
FC Ordabasy players
FC Kyzylzhar players
FC Bayterek players
FC Zhenis Astana players
Place of birth missing (living people)
Association football wingers